Todd Brook is a small river running through the English counties of Cheshire and Derbyshire.

The Brook rises beneath Shining Tor on the border between the two counties and flows northwards through east Cheshire, passing by Jenkin Chapel, Windgather Rocks and Kettleshulme before turning east, forming the border between Cheshire and Derbyshire for a short distance before filling Toddbrook Reservoir in Derbyshire.

The brook flows into the River Goyt at Whaley Bridge.

The brook's Environment Agency pollution classification changed from good to moderate in 2014.

References

Rivers of Cheshire
Rivers of Derbyshire
1Todd